The  is a railway line in Japan, running from Gobō Station to Nishi-Gobō Station. The railway line is located entirely within Gobō, Wakayama. It is the only remaining private railway line in Wakayama Prefecture that is entirely non-electrified, and is the second-shortest railway line in Japan.

Overview
It is the only line operated by the company, as the company mostly focuses in the real estate and hotel sectors. The current Tokyo-based company, which was previously not a railway operator, took over the line in 1973 in order to gain the prestige and trust associated with operating a railway line. The railway is the second shortest railway line in service in Japan, the shortest being the Shibayama Railway.

Additional basic data
Traction: internal combustion (diesel)
Railway signalling: staff token

Operation
Trains stop at all stations along the line. The entire line is single-track, and none of its railway stations have passing loops.
The railway depot for the line is located adjacent to  Station.

Station list

Rolling stock
, the railway operates a fleet of two Kitetsu 1 diesel railcars, numbered Kitetsu 1 and 2.

Diesel railcar KR301, formerly SKR301 used on the Shigaraki Kohgen Railway in Shiga Prefecture until October 2015 was introduced on the line from 30 January 2016.

History
The  opened the 1.8 km section from Gobō to Kii-Gobō section on 15 June 1931, extended 0.9 km to Nishi-Gobō on 10 April 1932, and to Hidakagawa on 10 August 1934.

The Gobō Rinkō Railway became the Kishu Railway from 1 January 1973. The 0.7 km section from Nishi-Gobō to Hidakagawa closed on 1 April 1989.

See also
List of railway companies in Japan
List of railway lines in Japan

References

External links 
  

Railway lines in Japan
Rail transport in Wakayama Prefecture
Railway lines opened in 1931